The meridian 75° east of Greenwich is a line of longitude that extends from the North Pole across the Arctic Ocean, Asia, the Indian Ocean, the Southern Ocean, and Antarctica to the South Pole.

The 75th meridian east forms a great circle with the 105th meridian west.

From Pole to Pole
Starting at the North Pole and heading south to the South Pole, the 75th meridian east passes through:

{| class="wikitable plainrowheaders"
! scope="col" width="125" | Co-ordinates
! scope="col" | Country, territory or sea
! scope="col" | Notes
|-
| style="background:#b0e0e6;" | 
! scope="row" style="background:#b0e0e6;" | Arctic Ocean
| style="background:#b0e0e6;" |
|-valign="top"
| style="background:#b0e0e6;" | 
! scope="row" style="background:#b0e0e6;" | Kara Sea
| style="background:#b0e0e6;" | Passing just east of Shokalsky Island, Yamalo-Nenets Autonomous Okrug, 
|-
| 
! scope="row" | 
| Yamalo-Nenets Autonomous Okrug — Gydan Peninsula
|-
| style="background:#b0e0e6;" | 
! scope="row" style="background:#b0e0e6;" | Gulf of Ob
| style="background:#b0e0e6;" |
|-
| 
! scope="row" | 
| Yamalo-Nenets Autonomous Okrug — Gydan Peninsula
|-
| style="background:#b0e0e6;" | 
! scope="row" style="background:#b0e0e6;" | Taz Estuary
| style="background:#b0e0e6;" |
|-valign="top"
| 
! scope="row" | 
| Yamalo-Nenets Autonomous Okrug Khanty-Mansi Autonomous Okrug — from  Tyumen Oblast — from  Omsk Oblast — from 
|-
| 
! scope="row" | 
| Passing through Lake Balkhash
|-
| 
! scope="row" | 
|
|-valign="top"
| 
! scope="row" | 
| Xinjiang
|-
| 
! scope="row" | 
|
|-valign="top"
| 
! scope="row" | 
| Xinjiang
|-valign="top"
| 
! scope="row" | 
|-
| 
! scope="row" | 
|Jammu and Kashmir 
|-
| 
! scope="row" | 
| Punjab
|-valign="top"
| 
! scope="row" | 
| Punjab Haryana— from  Rajasthan — from  Madhya Pradesh — from  Maharashtra — from  Karnataka — from  Kerala — from  Karnataka — from  Kerala — from 
|-
| style="background:#b0e0e6;" | 
! scope="row" style="background:#b0e0e6;" | Indian Ocean
| style="background:#b0e0e6;" |
|-
| style="background:#b0e0e6;" | 
! scope="row" style="background:#b0e0e6;" | Southern Ocean
| style="background:#b0e0e6;" |
|-
| 
! scope="row" | Antarctica
| Australian Antarctic Territory, claimed by 
|-
|}

See also
74th meridian east
76th meridian east

e075 meridian east